The 1992 Giro d'Italia was the 75th edition of the Giro d'Italia, one of cycling's Grand Tours. The field consisted of 180 riders, and 148 riders finished the race.

By rider

By nationality

References

1992 Giro d'Italia
1992